Naim Audio is a British hi-fi manufacturer based in Wiltshire, United Kingdom.  The company was founded in 1973. Following a 2011 merger with French loudspeaker manufacturer Focal, Naim is owned by VerVent Audio Group, a French company.

History
Naim began when Julian Vereker started Naim Audio Visual in 1969 and created a sound-to-light box that he hired out to film production companies. His disappointment with the sound of professional recording equipment at the time led him to design his own power amplifier. The company Naim Audio was incorporated in 1973. Against the conventional wisdom – dating back to audio pioneer Edgar Villchur – that the loudspeakers determined the sound of a hi-fi system, and that amplifiers were simply a means to an end in moving the speakers, Vereker set about putting his ideas into practice.

Amplifiers 

The first product Naim put on the market was the NAP160 power amplifier; it was soon followed by the NAC12 pre-amplifier. The two-channel NAP 250 amplifier, launched in 1975, is perhaps Naim Audio's most well-known analogue product, as its basic circuit layout was shared by all the company's power amplifiers until the introduction of the flagship NAP500 in 2000. The Naim NAIT, its first integrated amplifier, "one of the most controversial and famous integrated amps in the history of HiFi" has acquired a "legendary" status among integrated amplifiers.

R&D 
In 1983, Guy Lamotte was hired as a designer. He completed the development of the NA T01 and NAT101 FM tuners and piloted the development of the Hi-Cap power supply and the −5 modifications to the company's burgeoning pre-amplification (NAC42 and 32), the NAXO active crossover and the ARO uni-pivot tonearm (developed jointly with David Beck). Lamotte privately worked on a prototype electrostatic speaker design that attracted media attention. It was brought into the Naim fold in 1987, after the Linn/Naim partnership ended. Roy George, who joined in 1985 and was appointed Technical Director of Naim in 2000, is credited with designing many of Naim's iconic products.

In 2019, the parent company Vervent Audio Group expected to invest more than 8% of its sales revenue in research and development.

Following 
The company, and its products such as the NAIT, NAC52 pre-amplifier, the ARO uni-pivot tonearm and the SBL (Separate Box Loudspeaker) have assumed cult status among devotees.

After Vereker 
The company was headed by Vereker until his death in 2000, when Paul Stephenson, then Sales Director, became Managing Director until 2015. Stephenson saw turnover increase from £6m to £20m and led the company into digital streaming. Former R&D Director Trevor Wilson was Managing Director from 2015 to 2018. The business was then led by Charlie Henderson as Managing Director between 2018 and 2021, and by 2021 turnover had increased to £39million, yielding profit before tax of nearly £5million.

Design characteristics
Naim has a devoted following, gained through a combination of its products' performance, build quality, upgrade and after-sales philosophy. In terms of after-sales support, Naim boasts they can service all products ever manufactured by them.

Typically, the electronics incorporate over-engineered power supplies to ensure fast and generous current delivery to the audio circuitry. Naim also market independent low-noise power supplies to give its customers easy and effective upgrade paths for their pre-amplifiers and CD players.

Internally, the Naim design approach can be seen by their use of materials –– the semiconductors, heavy toroidal transformers, their obsessive attention to earthing, screening and isolation from electronic and mechanical interference, through to their preference for XLR connector, DIN connector and the BNC connector for phono (as opposed to the RCA connector used by almost all other manufacturers).

Until 1989, the company's electronics could be readily identified by their heavy black aluminium casing. Since their replacement by the 'olive' range, the earlier vintages are affectionately known as 'chrome bumper' models Electrically, the amplifiers are matched and designed to be used together. Naim warns against experimentation with other manufacturers' components, particularly in the case for some "high-end" loudspeaker cables, whose L/C characteristics were said by Naim to present unstable loads to the high-current devices used in Naim power amplifiers.

As with other brands such as Arcam and Cyrus, the company's instruction manuals state that "better and more consistent performance will be achieved if the system is left switched on for long periods." Many reviewers have also remarked on equipment sounding significantly better several weeks after being left switched on.

Digital audio

During much of the 1980s, Naim asserted that Compact Disc was a far inferior medium to the vinyl gramophone record. Early discs often lost something in the transfer compared to vinyl, and Naim continued to design their products in this context. However, by 1990 technological advances allowed the production of the Naim CDS, the first CD player considered worthy of the Naim brand. The announcement in 1989 that the company was working on a CD player shocked the marketplace. The player was unusual for a two-box device in that Naim put the digital–analogue converter in the same box as the transport and audio circuitry, whilst keeping the power supply separate. The Naim CDS has since seen two major revisions (now in its CDS3 incarnation) since its launch in 1991; while subsequent lower-priced extensions to the line are often used by hi-fi reviewers as references at their respective price points. The CD555, which is the "money no object" flagship priced at £15,000, is heralded by Naim as "the ultimate CD player".

Naim's Digital Audio offering was bolstered in 2017 with the internally labeled 'New Streaming Platform' that became the award-winning Uniti range of streamers, which comprised the Uniti Core, Uniti Nova, Uniti Star and Uniti Atom. The latter received an EISA award for Best All in One System, 2018–19.

Partnerships
During much of the 1970s and 80s, Naim adopted a symbiotic relationship with Linn Products, and their names were often mentioned in the same breath. At that time, a Linn Sondek LP12 turntable, Naim electronics and Linn loudspeakers was the preferred combination for many a serious audiophile.

The two companies had almost the same sales and marketing strategy, and shared many of the same retailers/dealers. As an upstart company, Vereker, the company's founder, was active in marketing and promotion, and appeared in the company's advertising. The company's emphasis on selling products through comparative demonstrations in a single-speaker environment was a move away from marketing space of the chain electronics stores in favour of small independent retailers [in the United Kingdom].

The two companies diverged during the 1980s, at the dawn of digital audio. This was partly due to the convergence of technology, but also because Naim had significantly fewer dealers than Linn. This presented problems for Linn dealers trying to sell Linn speakers that were specifically designed to work at their best with Naim amplification. Both Naim and Linn began broadening their product ranges and started encroaching on each other's historical areas of expertise: in 1985, Linn launched its LK1/LK2 amplification combination, signalling the definitive end of the partnership. Naim began making loudspeakers and Linn expanded its range of electronic components. In 1987, Naim announced that chief designer Guy Lamotte had been working on a prototype electrostatic speaker design, and that a product launch was imminent. However, the product never saw the light of day, having been axed because of cost escalation. In 1995, Naim announced the launch of the Armageddon power supply for the LP12.

In 2008, Naim partnered with car manufacturer Bentley in the "Naim for Bentley" project, an optional upgrade in-car sound system that had a degree of customer acceptance that surpassed expectations of both partners.

In 2010, Naim employed 140 staff, with products exported to more than 40 countries and half of its £15 million turnover coming from export. One-third of the business was from CD players. In 2011 and again in 2017, around 60 percent of sales went to export markets.

Ownership 
At the time of his death, Julian Vereker held half of the share capital of the company. The other half was in the hands of employees, including Paul Stephenson who owned 20 percent. Vereker bequeathed his shares to be held in a trust of which Stephenson is trustee.

2011: Focal & Co 
In August 2011, Naim and Focal-JMLab announced a merger of both companies. Focal & Co., the new entity to be formed to own the existing operations, would employ 325 people in total at two sites, in Saint Etienne, France, and Salisbury, UK. Pro-forma annual turnover of the new company was £48 million. The Naim and Focal brands would continue to operate independently, while collaborating on R&D.

The shareholders of Focal & Co are those that respectively owned the company prior to the merger (namely Jacques Mahul, CM-CIC and the management of Focal and Naim), suggesting the merger being executed by an exchange of shares for shares in the holding company. No ownership statistics and no valuation were mentioned.

2014: Vervent Audio Group 
In May 2014, French investors Naxicap Partners and French private equity firm Aquasorca announced they had acquired a majority stake in the Focal & Co group, which was renamed to Vervent Audio Group.

In August 2017, Focal.JMLab UK Limited, the distributor of Focal speakers in the UK, was merged into Naim Audio Limited. In late 2019, Alpha Private Equity became the majority shareholder of Vervent. Naim Audio Limited continues to operate as a British company and as a subsidiary of Vervent.

Record label

Naim entered into the record business to supply compact discs which were technically and musically good enough to satisfy analogue/vinyl disciples. The first CD to appear on the Naim record label was Electric Glide by Gary Boyle, one of the company's favourite vinyl demo records. Naim's Marketing Director Ryan Latham guided the record label until 2018, with James Tailby taking over in June 2018.

References

External links